Karimabad-e Deh Tajgi (also Romanized as Karīmābād-e Deh Tajgī; also known as Karīmābād) is a village in Eskelabad Rural District, Nukabad District, Khash County, Sistan and Baluchestan Province, Iran.
 At the 2006 census, its population was 152, in 30 families.

References 

Populated places in Khash County